Koloksha is a rural locality (a village) in Kolokshanskoye Rural Settlement, Sobinsky District, Vladimir Oblast, Russia. The population was 31 as of 2010. There are 6 streets.

Geography 
Koloksha is located on the Koloksha River, 20 km northeast of Sobinka (the district's administrative centre) by road. Parfentyevo is the nearest rural locality.

References 

Rural localities in Sobinsky District